Twenty 4 Hours a Day, Seven Days a Week is the fourth and final studio album by the Dutch group Twenty 4 Seven. It was released in 1997 by CNR Music. The album was also released in The Netherlands, Germany, Austria and Czech Republic. The album was released only on mp3 format in the United Kingdom. The record released three singles: "We Are the World", "If You Want My Love" and "Friday Night".

Nancy Coolen left the group and was replaced by Stella.

Track listing
"We Are the World" – 3:37
"Here Is My Heart" – 3:41
"Friday Night" – 3:39
"Free" – 4:23
"Angel" (vocals – Erica Verhoeven, Gilbert Themen) – 3:57
"If You Want My Love" – 3:46
"Gimme Lovin'" (vocals – Saskia van Bokhoven) – 3:28
"We Are the World (The World According To Ruyters & Romero Remix) (Remix – Andres Romero, Wim van Limpt) – 4:39
"Friday Night" (Paradisio Club Mix) (Remix – Paradisio) – 5:10
"If You Want My Love" (Charly Lownoise & Mental Theo Freestyle Remix) (Remix – Charly Lownoise & Mental Theo) – 4:20

Credits
 Vocals – Stay-C, Stella
 Marketed by CNR Music
 Distributed by CNR Music

References

External links
TWENTY 4 SEVEN Discography

1997 albums
Twenty 4 Seven albums